Joseph Dorr Clapp (December 31, 1811October 27, 1900) was an American banker, Democratic politician, and Wisconsin pioneer.  He served two years in the Wisconsin State Senate, representing Jefferson County.  In contemporaneous documents he was frequently referred to as J. D. Clapp.

Biography
J. D. Clapp was born in Westminster, Vermont, on New Year's Eve 1811.  He moved to Milford, Wisconsin Territory, in 1839 and was a farmer. 

In 1859, he started the Koshkonong Bank in partnership with Lucien B. Caswell.  The bank later merged into the First National Bank, and Clapp served as president of the merged bank until his death in 1900.  He served in the Wisconsin State Senate for the 1862 and 1863 sessions. His brother was Mark R. Clapp who served in the Wisconsin Territorial Legislature.

Clapp died in Fort Atkinson, Wisconsin.

References

External links
 

1811 births
1900 deaths
People from Westminster (town), Vermont
Wisconsin state senators
People from Milford, Wisconsin
Businesspeople from Wisconsin
Farmers from Wisconsin
19th-century American politicians
People from Fort Atkinson, Wisconsin